Saline River may refer to:

United States
Saline River (Little River tributary), in southwestern Arkansas
Saline River (Ouachita River tributary), in southern Arkansas
Saline River (Illinois), a tributary of the Ohio River
Saline River (Kansas), a tributary of the Smoky Hill River
Battle of the Saline River, August 1867
Saline River (Michigan), a tributary of the River Raisin
Saline Bayou, in Winn Parish, Louisiana, a tributary of the Red River

Elsewhere
Saline (Italian river), a river in Abruzzo

See also
 Saline Branch, a tributary of the Vermilion River in Illinois, United States
 Saline Creek (disambiguation)